Marshall Browne (27 November 193514 February 2014) was an Australian crime fiction writer.

A former merchant banker, he lived in Hong Kong, London, and Bhutan.  He later lived in Melbourne.  He served as a commando in the Australian forces, and as a paratrooper in the British forces.

He died in Melbourne on 14 February 2014.

Awards and nominations
Glen Eira Literary Awards, 'My Brother Jack' Short Story Award, 1999: joint winner for Point of Departure, Point of Return
Ned Kelly Awards for Crime Writing, Best First Novel Award, 2000: winner for The Wooden Leg of Inspector Anders
The Los Angeles Times Book Prize, 2002: shortlisted for The Wooden Leg of Inspector Anders
Ned Kelly Awards for Crime Writing, Best Novel, 2006: shortlisted for Rendezvous at Kamakura Inn

Bibliography

The Melbourne Trilogy
The Gilded Cage (1996)
The Burnt City (1999)
The Trumpeting Angel (2001)

Inspector Anders series
The Wooden Leg of Inspector Anders (1999)
Inspector Anders and the Ship of Fools (2001)
Inspector Anders and the Blood Vendetta (2006)

Franz Schmidt series
The Eye of the Abyss (2002)
The Iron Heart (2009)

Standalone Novels
Dragon Strike (1981)
City of Masks (1981)
Dark Harbour (1984)
Rendezvous at Kamakura Inn (2006)

Notes
Browne's novels include The Melbourne Trilogy series of historical novels (The Gilded Cage, The Burnt City, and The Trumpeting Angel), the Inspector Anders series of crime novels (The Wooden Leg of Inspector Anders, Inspector Anders and the Ship of Fools and Inspector Anders and the Blood Vendetta), and the Frank Scmidt series (Eye of the Abyss and The Iron Heart).

The author stated that he intended to write further works featuring Hideo Aoki, the Tokyo Metropolitan Police detective from Rendezvous at Kamakura Inn.

Interviews
Jason Steger for "The West Australian"

References

External links
Author's website 
Marshall Browne page on Crimespace 

1935 births
2014 deaths
20th-century Australian novelists
21st-century Australian novelists
Australian crime writers
Australian male novelists
Writers from Melbourne
Ned Kelly Award winners
20th-century Australian male writers
21st-century Australian male writers